Asso is an Italian comune in the Province of Como.

Asso or ASSO may alo refer to:
 Asso (film), a comedy directed by Franco Castellano and Giuseppe Moccia
 Asso Station, a train station in Kamitonda, Nishimuro District, Wakayama Prefecture, Japan
 Association of Revolutionary Visual Artists, a Communist artists organization in Germany (1928–1933)
 Isotta Fraschini Asso XI, a V12 piston aeroengine produced in the 1930s
 Asso Aerei, an Italian range of light and ultralight aircraft

People with the name
 Ignacio Jordán Claudio de Asso y del Río (1742–1814), Spanish diplomat, naturalist, lawyer and historian
 Raymond Asso (1901–1968), French lyricist
 Asso Kommer (born 1966), Estonian politician and former soldier

See also 
 Asos, a village on the island of Kefalonia, Greece
 Assos, a town in Çanakkale Province, Turkey